PriceSmart, Inc. (NASDAQ: PSMT) is an operator of membership warehouse clubs in Central America, the Caribbean, and South America. PriceSmart was founded by Sol and Robert Price, founders of The Price Club; Robert Price is chairman of the board.

Warehouse clubs 
The following table lists the warehouse clubs owned and operated currently by PriceSmart:

Key dates

References

External links
 PriceSmart
 Company Information

Companies based in San Diego
Retail companies of the United States
Retail companies established in 1993
Companies listed on the Nasdaq